Catherine Génisson (born 22 April 1949) is French politician.  She represented the Pas-de-Calais department in the National Assembly of France from 1 June 1997 to 30 September 2011 as a member of the Socialiste, radical, citoyen et divers gauche. She represents the department of Pas-de-Calais in the French Senate.

The daughter of painter , she was first elected to the French assembly in 1997 and was reelected in 2002 and 2007. She was elected to the French senate on September 25, 2011.

References

1949 births
Living people
Socialist Party (France) politicians
French Senators of the Fifth Republic
Women members of the National Assembly (France)
Women members of the Senate (France)
Deputies of the 12th National Assembly of the French Fifth Republic
Deputies of the 13th National Assembly of the French Fifth Republic
21st-century French women politicians
Senators of Pas-de-Calais